The Barbarian Football Club, known as the Barbarians is a British-based invitational rugby union club. The Barbarians play in black and white hoops, though players wear socks from their own club strip. Membership is by invitation. As of 2011, players from 31 countries had played for them. Traditionally at least one uncapped player is selected for each match.

Until rugby union became a professional sport, the Barbarians usually played six annual matches: with Penarth, Cardiff, Swansea and Newport at Easter; a game with Leicester on 27 December and the Mobbs Memorial Match against East Midlands in the spring. In 1948, the Barbarians were invited to face Australia as part of the Wallabies' tour of Britain, Ireland and France. Although initially designed as a fundraiser towards the end of the tour, the encounter became a popular and traditional fixture. Initially played every three years, it has become more frequent in the professional era, with the Barbarians now often playing one of the national teams visiting Britain each autumn.

On 29 May 2011, at halftime in the Barbarians' match against England at Twickenham, the Barbarians and their founder William Percy Carpmael were honoured with induction to the IRB Hall of Fame. A women's team was established in 2017.

Many rugby clubs around the world are based on the Barbarians model of an invitational scratch team, including the French Barbarians, Australian Barbarians, New Zealand Barbarians and South African Barbarians.

History

The Barbarian Club was formed by William Percy Carpmael, who had played rugby for Cambridge University, and had been part of the Cambridge team which had undertaken a tour of Yorkshire in 1884. Inspired by the culture behind short rugby tours he organised his first tour in 1889 with Clapham Rovers, which was followed by an 1890 tour with an invitational team calling themselves the Southern Nomads. At the time practically every club ceased playing in early March and there were no tours and players just 'packed up' until the following season. In 1890 he took the Southern Nomads – mainly composed of players from Blackheath – on a tour of some northern counties of England.

His idea – collecting a touring side from all sources to tackle a few leading clubs in the land – received strong support from leading players, particularly ex-university players. On 8 April 1890, in Leuchters Restaurant and later at the Alexandra Hotel in Bradford, the concept of the Barbarians was agreed upon. The team toured later that year and beat Hartlepool Rovers 9–4 on 27 December in their first fixture.

The team was given the motto by Walter Julius Carey, former Bishop of Bloemfontein and a former member of the Barbarians:

Penarth

The concept took hold over the years and the nearest thing to a club home came to be the Esplanade Hotel at Penarth in South Wales, where the Barbarians always stayed on their Easter tours of Wales. The annual Good Friday game against the Barbarians was the highlight of the Penarth club's year and was always attended by enthusiastic capacity crowds. This fixture marked the start of the Baa-Baas' annual South Wales tour from their "spiritual home" of Penarth, which also included playing Cardiff RFC on the Saturday, Swansea RFC on Easter Monday and Newport RFC on the Tuesday.

The non-match day of Easter Sunday would always see the Barbarians playing golf at the Glamorganshire Golf Club, in Penarth, while the former Esplanade Hotel, which was located on the seafront at Penarth, would host the gala party for the trip, sponsored by Penarth RFC. The first match took place in 1901, and over the next 75 encounters, Penarth won eleven games, drew four and lost 60. Between 1920 and the first Athletics Field game in 1925, the Good Friday games were hosted on Penarth County Grammar School's sports field.

The final Penarth v Barbarians game was played in 1986, by which time the Penarth club had slipped from its prominent position in Welsh rugby. However, a special commemorative game, recognising the 100 years since the first Good Friday match, took place in 2001 and was played at the Athletic Field next to the Penarth clubhouse the day before the Barbarians played Wales at the Millennium Stadium. Gary Teichmann, captain of South Africa and the Barbarians, unveiled a plaque at the clubhouse to mark the event.

The Final Challenge
After the Second World War, in 1948, the Barbarians were asked by the British and Irish unions to raise a side to play the touring Australia team, to raise funds for the Australians' journey home via Canada. This started the tradition of the "Final Challenge" – played as the last match in a tour of Britain and Ireland by Australia, New Zealand or South Africa.

'The best try ever scored'

The Barbarian 'Final Challenge' match with the All Blacks at Cardiff Arms Park on 27 January 1973 is celebrated as one of the best games of rugby union ever played. It was a game of attack and counterattack, and the Barbarians won the match 23–11, handing the All Blacks their fourth defeat of the tour. Gareth Edwards scored a try widely considered to be one of the best ever in rugby union.

Cliff Morgan described Gareth Edwards' try:

Gareth Edwards said of the match:

Traditional matches
The nature of the Barbarians as a touring side made for a diverse fixture list, but at a number of points in the club's history they have settled for a time into a regular pattern. Most of these regular matches have fallen by the wayside, whilst others continue to the present day:

 27 December game against Leicester Tigers – this began in 1909 as the third and final match of the Christmas Tour. It was played for the last time as a regular fixture in March 2006 but returned in November 2014 when the Barbarians beat Leicester 59–26 in their 125th anniversary season.
 The Edgar Mobbs Memorial Match – held for Edgar Mobbs, who was killed in the First World War. Played at Franklins Gardens against Northampton Saints, Bedford Blues or the East Midlands select XV. The first took place on 10 February 1921, and in later years became a tradition on the first Thursday in March. The last Mobbs Match to feature the Barbarians took place in April 2011. Since then, the invited opposition has been a British Army side instead of the Barbarians.
 Easter Tour – traditionally four matches against Penarth RFC (Good Friday), Cardiff RFC/Cardiff Blues (Holy Saturday); Swansea RFC (Easter Monday) and Newport RFC (Tuesday following Easter Monday). The Penarth match was dropped after 1986 as a regular fixture although in 2001 a special commemorative game, recognising 100 years since the first Good Friday match, was played at the Athletic Field next to the Penarth clubhouse the day before the Barbarians played Wales at the Millennium Stadium. The game against Newport was moved away from Easter after the 1982 fixture due to problems fielding a team for the fourth match of the tour and was played as a midweek game early in the season from September 1982 onwards. The Barbarians last played Newport in November 1996.
 The Final Challenge – played as the last match in a tour of the UK by Australia, New Zealand or South Africa. Initially played every three years, these games have become more frequent in the professional era. The fixture on 3 December 2008 between the Barbarians and Australia was played at Wembley Stadium, the first rugby union match played there since its redevelopment.
 Remembrance Day game against the Combined Services, played in November. The fixture was first played in 1997 and the most recent game, in 2014, resulted in a 31–15 win for the Barbarians.

They typically compete against teams from the home nations (England, Wales, Scotland and Ireland) as well as other international sides. Other matches are played against club teams, often to celebrate anniversaries. The 2014–15 fixture list included matches against Leicester Tigers and Heriot's Rugby Club in addition to the Final Challenge game with Australia and the annual Combined Services match. The Heriot's game celebrated the 125th anniversary of both that club and the Barbarians, while the Leicester game was also part of the Barbarians' 125th anniversary schedule. The Barbarians were also invited to play in the first ever Rugby match at the London Olympic Stadium in 2015 against Samoa.

Olympic rugby union centenary celebration match
Australia was approached by the British Olympic Association to play the Barbarians at Wembley Stadium on 3 December 2008. The match formed part of the BOA's programme of events to celebrate the centenary of the first London Olympic Games where Australia defeated a Great Britain (Cornwall) side in the final 32–3. In 1908 France were the defending Olympic champions, but when they withdrew from the event, leaving just Australia and Great Britain to contest the gold medal, it was then County champions Cornwall who took to the field to represent the host nation. Cornwall had already been defeated in Australia's earlier 31-match tour. Cornwall's 1908 contribution was also further recognised by the presentation of the Cornwall Cup to the winning 2008 captain at Wembley, with the players of the respective sides receiving gold or silver commemorative medals. The 2008 game was the first rugby union fixture to take place in the new Wembley Stadium. Australia went on to win 18 points to 11.

In a change to the tradition of the Barbarians players wearing their own club socks, in this game, they all wore Cornwall's black and gold socks. The break with the tradition was highly regarded by the secretary of the Cornwall Rugby Football Union, Alan Mitchell, who was said to have been humbled by the honour.

Women's team
In October 2017 a women's team was announced for the first time in the club's history. Their first match was a 19–0 victory against Munster on 10 November 2017, played as part of a double header with the men's team playing Tonga. They subsequently played a match against the British Army in March 2018, winning 37–0.

Their first-ever match against international competition saw six tries scored in a 34–33 victory against the USA at Infinity Park in the Denver suburb of Glendale, Colorado. On 2 June 2019, Barbarians Women took on England at Twickenham as the prelude to a men's Barbarians match against an England XV (non-cap match) losing the contest 40–14 (two tries scored to six conceded). They went on to beat Wales at the Principality Stadium 43–33 on 30 November 2019 scoring 5 tries to 3 conceded.

Matches against national teams
The Barbarian F.C. have played men's international matches since 1915 and women's international matches since 2019.

Overall

Current squad
Barbarians squad to face Spain on 25 June.

Head coach:  John Mulvihill

Note: Bold denotes players that have represented the Barbarians in previous matches. Italics represents uncapped players.

Previous squads

Presidents
The club's current president is former England and Barbarians player John Spencer, who was named in the position in December 2019.

The office was first instituted in 1913. The previous six presidents were:

W. P. Carpmael, held office 1913–1936; the founder of the Barbarians
Emile de Lissa, 1936–1955; associated as Secretary, Treasurer, Vice-President and President from 1901 to 1955
Jack "Haigho" Smith, 1955; his term lasted for only a few weeks before his death, having previously given devoted service as Honorary Secretary for more than 30 years.
Brigadier Glyn Hughes, 1955–1973
Herbert Waddell, 1973–1988
Micky Steele-Bodger, 1988–2019

Honours

 Melrose Sevens
 Champions (1): 2001

See also
 Australian Barbarians
 French Barbarians
 New Zealand Barbarians
 South African Barbarians

Bibliography
 
 Evans, Alan (2005), The Barbarians, the United Nations of Rugby, with a foreword by Sir Anthony O'Reilly, Mainstream Publishing Company, Edinburgh

References

External links
 Official site
 Barbarians history from the BBC
 Barbarians history from scrum.com
 Barbarians International Matches
 Barbarians rugby union news from Planet Rugby

 
International rugby union teams
World Rugby Hall of Fame inductees
Multinational rugby union teams
British rugby union clubs